Softball was played at the 2007 Southeast Asian Games. The Philippines national softball teams were the defending gold medalists.

The games were held at the NRRU Football Field, with 2 events: men's softball and women's softball. The tournament format is a single round-robin followed by 2-step knockout stage, with the #1 team getting a bye up to the grand final, while the #2 gets a bye up to the final.

The Philippines men's and women's softball teams defended their gold medals successfully, finishing undefeated in the tournament.

Men's tournament

Pool play

Playoffs

Women's tournament

Pool play

Playoffs

Medal summary

Medal tally

Medalists

References
Softball at the official website of the 2007 SEA Games

2007 Southeast Asian Games events
Southeast Asian Games
Softball at the Southeast Asian Games
International softball competitions hosted by the Philippines